Poorman may refer to:

Poorman, Alaska, unincorporated community in the Yukon-Koyukuk Census Area of the Unorganized Borough of the U.S. state of Alaska
PoorMan, light-weight web server bundled with the BeOS and Haiku operating system
"Poorman", song by Depeche Mode from Spirit
The Poorman or Jim Trenton, American radio broadcaster

People with the surname Poorman

Christian L. Poorman (1825–1912), American politician
Mark L. Poorman, American theologian and academic administrator
Tom Poorman (1857–1905), American baseball player

See also
Poor Man (disambiguation)